"This Fire" is a song by Scottish indie rock band Franz Ferdinand, the seventh track on their self-titled debut album. It was written by Alex Kapranos and Nick McCarthy and produced by the band themselves at their studio in Scotland during 2003. A new version of the song, produced by Rich Costey, was released as a single on 4 October 2004, titled "This Fffire". The single artwork is based on El Lissitzky's art work Beat the Whites with the Red Wedge.

Song history
The song was later sampled for "Burn This City" by Lil Wayne and Twista. "This Fire" was Franz Ferdinand's standard set closer until July 2009, when it was replaced with "Lucid Dreams". In 2022, the Rich Costey version of the song was selected as the intro song to the Cyberpunk 2077 tie-in anime from Studio Trigger, Cyberpunk: Edgerunners.

Release and reception
In the United States and the United Kingdom, the song was released as a radio and download single, respectively, reaching number 17 on the US Billboard Modern Rock Tracks chart and number eight on the UK Download Chart. In Australia, the song was released as a CD single and reached number 62 on the ARIA Singles Chart. In the same country, it was ranked number 29 on Triple J's Hottest 100 of 2004.

Music video
The music video, directed by Stylewar, echoes the style of 1920s-era Soviet art and propaganda (Constructivism etc.), including Cyrillic lettering, and shows the members of the band spreading a world-wide "hypnosis epidemic".

Track listings
All tracks were written by Alex Kapranos and Nick McCarthy except "Missing You", written by Kapranos.

 Digital download 
 "This Fffire" (Rich Costey re-record) – 3:38
 "This Fire" (Playgroup remix) – 8:13

 European enhanced CD single 
 "This Fffire"
 "This Fire" (Playgroup remix)
 "This Fffire" (video)

 Australian CD single 
 "This Fffire" (Rich Costey re-record)
 "Love and Destroy"
 "Missing You"

Charts

Release history

References

2004 singles
Franz Ferdinand (band) songs
Songs written by Alex Kapranos
Songs written by Nick McCarthy
2004 songs
Domino Recording Company singles